Amaroria is a genus of flowering plants belonging to the family Simaroubaceae. It contains one species, Amaroria soulameoides , endemic to Fiji. It is a small dioecious tree.

References

Simaroubaceae
Monotypic Sapindales genera
Dioecious plants